The 2006–07 A Group was the 59th season of the Bulgarian A Football Group since its establishment in 1948 and the 83rd of a Bulgarian national top football division.

The league was contested by 16 teams, thirteen returning from the 2005–06 season and three promoted from the B Group. Levski Sofia won the championship scoring a record 96 goals.

Changes from last season
Three teams were relegated at the end of the 2005–06 season: Pirin 1922 Blagoevgrad, Naftex Burgas, and FC Pirin Blagoevgrad. The latter was disqualified for financial reasons after the first two rounds. 

The relegated teams were replaced by Spartak Varna and Rilski Sportist, the two regional winners of B PFG. Spartak Varna make an immediate return to the top tier, while Rilski Sportist return after a three-year absence. A further place in the league was decided through a one match playoff, between Chernomorets Burgas Sofia and Maritsa Plovdiv, the two runners-up from the two B Groups. Chernomorets won the match 3-2 and promoted to the top tier for the very first time.

League table

Results

Champions
Levski Sofia

Georgi Ivanov left the club during a season.

Top scorers

References

External links
Bulgaria - List of final tables (RSSSF)
2006–07 Statistics of A Group at a-pfg.com

First Professional Football League (Bulgaria) seasons
Bulgaria
1